Playa de la Arnía, commonly known as Arnía, is a beach located in the natural park of the Dunas de Liencres and Costa Quebrada, between the municipalities of Piélagos and Santa Cruz de Bezana, in the autonomous community of Cantabria, Spain.

The beach is located in a rocky environment, with rocks that are more than 90 million years old.

References

Beaches of Cantabria